The Trưng sisters (𠄩婆徵, literally "Two Ladies [named] Trưng",  
14 – c. 43) were Vietnamese military leaders who ruled for three years after rebelling in AD 40 against the first Chinese domination of Vietnam.  They are regarded as national heroines of Vietnam. Their names were Trưng Trắc (Chinese pinyin: Zheng Ce; Wade–Giles: Cheng1 Ts'e2) and Trưng Nhị (Chinese pinyin: Zheng Er ; Wade–Giles: Cheng1 Erh4). Trưng Trắc was the first woman to be a Vietnamese monarch, as well as the only queen regnant in the history of Vietnam (Lý Chiêu Hoàng was the second woman to take the reign and is the only empress regnant), and she was accorded the title Queen Trưng (Chữ Quốc ngữ: ,) in Đại Việt sử ký toàn thư.

The sisters were born in Jiaozhi (Giao Chỉ), a commandery of the Chinese Han dynasty in modern-day northern Vietnam. The dates of their births are unknown, but Trưng Trắc was older than Trưng Nhị. The exact dates of their deaths are also unknown but both died around 43 AD after battling against the punitive expedition force led by Ma Yuan.

The Trưng sisters were highly educated under the watchful eyes of their father; they excelled in both literature and martial arts. Both were in line to inherit their father's land and titles.

Historical background

The former Qin commander Zhao Tuo (Trieu Da in Vietnamese) established the state of Nanyue in 204 BC and had conquered Âu Lạc in 180 BC, incorporating the Vietnamese realm into his own. In 112 BC, Emperor Wu of Han dispatched soldiers against Nanyue and the kingdom was annexed in 111 BC during the ensuing Han conquest of Nanyue. Nine commanderies were established to administer the region, three of which were located in what is now northern Vietnam. Revolts of local tribes against the Han began in 40 AD led by the Trưng sisters.

Biography

The Trưng sisters were daughters of a wealthy aristocratic family of Lạc ethnicity (The Lac were sorts of a confederation of multi-ethnic peoples). Their father had been a Lạc lord in Mê Linh district (modern-day Mê Linh District, Hanoi). Trưng Trắc's husband was Thi Sách (Shi Suo), was also the Lạc lord of Chu Diên (modern-day Khoái Châu District, Hưng Yên Province). Su Ding, the Chinese governor of Jiaozhi province at the time, is remembered by his cruelty and tyranny. According to the Book of the Later Han, Thi Sách was "of a fierce temperament", and Su Ding attempted to restrain him with legal procedures, literally to behead him without trial. Trưng Trắc stirred her husband to action and became the central figure in mobilizing the Lạc lords against the Chinese. In March of 40 AD, Trưng Trắc and her younger sister Trưng Nhị, led the Lạc Việt to rise up in rebellion against the Han.

The Book of the Later Han recorded that Trưng Trắc launched the rebellion to avenge the killing of her husband. It began at the Red River Delta, but soon spread to other Lạc and non-Han peoples from an area stretching from Hepu Commandery to Rinan. Chinese settlements were overrun, and Su Ding fled. The uprising gained the support of about sixty-five towns and settlements. Trưng Trắc was proclaimed as queen regnant. The status of Trưng Nhị was not mentioned in Đại Việt sử ký toàn thư. According to Việt Nam sử lược, Trưng Nhị reigned as co-king(queen) but according to folk literature, Trưng Nhị became a vice-king(queen).

In 42 AD, the Han emperor commissioned general Ma Yuan to suppress the rebellion with 20,000 troops. The rebellion of the two sisters was defeated in the next year as Ma Yuan captured and decapitated Trưng Trắc and Trưng Nhị, then sent their heads to the Han court in Luoyang.

The Song dynasty poet and calligrapher Huang Tingjian (1045–1105) compared the Trưng sisters to Lü Jia, the prime minister of Nanyue who resisted Han Wu Di's army in 112 BCE:
Lü Jia refused treasonous brides;
Trưng Trắc raised her shield to resist oppression

Historiography
The primary historical source for the sisters is the 5th century Book of the Later Han compiled by historian Fan Ye, which covers the history of the Han Dynasty from 6 to CE 189. The secondary source, but the primary popular source, is the Đại Việt sử ký toàn thư (Complete Annals of Dai Viet) compiled by Ngô Sĩ Liên under the order of the Emperor Lê Thánh Tông and finished in 1479.

Chinese sources
The Chinese traditional historical accounts on the Trưng sisters are remarkably brief. They are found in several different chapters of the Book of the Later Han, the history for the Eastern Han Dynasty, against which the Trưng sisters had carried out their uprising.

Book of Later Han; 5th century AD
Chapter eighty-six of the Book of the Later Han, entitled Biographies of the Southern and the Southwestern Barbarians, has this short passage:

In the 16th year of the Jianwu era (40 AD), Jiaozhi (交阯; WD: Chiao-chih) woman Zheng Ce (徵側; SV: Trưng Trắc) and her younger sister Zheng Er (徵貳; SV: Trưng Nhị) rebelled and attacked the commandery['s strongholds]. As for Zheng Ce, she was the daughter of the Luo general of Miling prefecture (麊泠; SV: Mê Linh). She was married as wife to Shi Suo (詩索; SV: Thi Sách), a man in Zhouyuan (朱鳶; SV: Chu Diên). She/he(?) was/They were(?) remarkably heroic and couragerous. Su Ding (蘇定; WD: Su Ting), the administrator of Jiaozhi restrained her (them?) with law; Ce became infuriated, rebelled, and attacked. Thus, the barbarians in Jiuzhen (九眞; WD Chiu-chen), Rinan (日南; WD:Jih-nan), Hepu (合浦; WD: Hop'u) all supported her. All in all, she took sixty-five strongholds and established herself as queen. Jiaozhi's governor and administrators could but defend themselves. (Emperor) Guangwu thus decreed that Changsha (長沙; WD: Ch'ang-sha), Hepu, and Jiaozhi, all must furnish chariots and boats, repair roads and bridges, dredge obstructed waterways, and store foods and provisions. In the 18th year (42 CE), he dispatched Wave-Subduing General Ma Yuan (馬援 ; WD: Ma Yüan), Tower-ship General Duan Zhi (段志 ; WD: Tuan Chih) [and Household General Liu Long (劉隆; WD: Liu Long)], who led over 10,000 troops from Ch'ang-sha, Guiyang (桂陽; SV: Quế Dương); Lingling (零陵; SV: Linh Lăng); Cangwu (蒼梧; SV: Thương Ngô) on a punitive expedition. Summer next year (43 CE), in the fourth month, Ma Yuan devastated Jiaozhi, beheaded Zheng Ce, Zheng Er, and others; the rest all surrendered or scattered. He advanced and attacked the Jiuzhen's rebel Du Yang (都陽; SV: Đô Dương) and others, routing and subduing them. He exiled over 300 rebel leaders to Lingling. Thus the regions beyond the Ridge were entirely pacified.

Chapter twenty-four, the biographies of Ma and some of his notable male descendants, had this parallel description:

Then Jiaozhi woman Zheng Ce and [her] younger sister Zheng Er rebelled; [they] attacked and the commandery was lost. The barbarians in Jiuzhen, Rinan, Hepu all supported [the Zheng sisters]. The rebels captured over sixty strongholds beyond the Ridge; Ce established herself as queen. Then a sealed decree honored Yuan as Wave-Subduing General, assigned Fule Marquis Liu Long as his assistant, dispatched Tower-ship general Duan Zhi, etc. southwards to attack Jiaozhi. When the army reached Hepu, Zhi fell ill and died; [the Emperor] decreed that Yuan command his [Zhi's] soldiers also. Then [Yuan's army] advanced along the coastline and the mountains, opening a path over thousands of li long. In the spring of the 18th [Jianwu] year (40 CE), [Yuan's] army reached up to Langbo (浪泊; SV: Lãng Bạc), fought with the rebels, routed them, decapitated thousands, [and] over tens of thousands surrendered. Yuan chased Zheng Ce to the Forbidden Gorge (禁谿; SV: Cấm Khê); defeated many times, the rebels then scattered and fled. The first month of next year (43 CE), Zheng Ce and Zheng Er were beheaded, their heads sent to Luoyang. Yuan was enfeoffed as Marquis of Xinsi, [his] fief [containing] three-thousand households. Yuan then slaughtered oxen, and distilled wines, and rewarded the soldiers [and] officers [for their] hard work...

Yuan commanded over 2,000 tower-ships big and small, over 20,000 soldiers, advanced and attacked the bandit Zheng Ce's remnants Du Yang (都羊, SV: Đô Dương) et al., from Wugong (無功; SV: Vô Công) to Jufeng (居風, SV: Cư Phong), beheading [or] capturing over 5,000; south of the mountains everywhere [was] pacified. Yuan reported that Xiyu prefecture (西於; SV: Tây Ư) had 32,000 households, its boundaries [were] over thousands of li from the court; he requested that [Xiyu prefecture] be divided into two prefectures: Fengxi (封溪, SV: Phong Khê) and Wanghai (望海; SV: Vọng Hải); [the request] was granted. Yuan immediately seized the momentum, established commanderies and prefectures, repaired the strongholds and ramparts, dredged the irrigation canals, and benefited the people. [Yuan] reported [to the Emperor] Yue law and Han law differed in more than ten rules; towards the Yue people, the old rules were clarified in order to restrain them. Henceforth, the Luoyue (駱越) obeyed General Ma's laws.

Autumn of the 20th year (44 CE), [Ma Yuan] brought the troops back to the capital; the troops had been suffering from miasma and epidemic, four to five died out of ten. Yuan was bestowed a military carriage; in court-meetings, [he] ranked among the Nine Ministers.

Records of Jiao Province's Outer Territories, 4th century AD
An older, yet less-known account, from the now-lost Records of Jiao Province's Outer Territories (交州外域記) was quoted in the 6th-century word Commentary on the Water Classic (水經注) by Northern Wei geographer Li Daoyuan:

Later, the son of Zhouyuan's Luo general, named Shi (詩; SV: Thi), asked the daughter of Ming ling's Luo general, named Zheng Ce (徵側; SV: Trưng Trắc), to be his wife. Ce, as a human being, possessed mettle and courage. Alongsides Shi, she uprose and rebelled, attacking and devastating Jiao Province, as well as reducing the Luo generals into subordination. Zheng Ce made [herself] queen. Starting from Miling prefecture, she occupied two divisions Jiaozhi and Jiuzhen, and for two years taxed the people. Later on, the Han (court) dispatched Wave-Subduing General to lead troops on a punitive expedition. Ce and Shi fled into the Golden Gorge (金溪 SV; Kim Khê). Ma Yuan hunted them down and captured them after three years. Now [from] Western Shu [there were] also troops dispatched on punitive expedition against Ce and Shi and others and all those commanderies and prefectures were pacified; then magistrates were instituted there.

The traditional Chinese accounts differed from Vietnamese traditional accounts in many places: Chinese accounts do not indicate oppression of the Vietnamese population by the Chinese officials and Su Ding's killing of Trưng Trắc's husband. In the Chinese account, the Trưng sisters did not commit suicide. Chinese sources also contradicted accounts in Vietnamese folk history that the Trưng sisters' retainers followed their examples and also committed suicide.

Vietnamese chronicles

Excerpts from Complete Annals of Đại Việt, 1479

The third book of Đại Việt sử ký toàn thư (Complete Annals of Dai Viet), published in editions between 1272 and 1697, has the following to say about the Trưng Sisters:

Lê Văn Hưu (Trần dynasty's historian) wrote:

Ngô Sĩ Liên (the Complete Annals chief compiler) wrote:

Cultural significance

Nationalism
The Trưng Sisters are highly revered in Vietnam, as they led the first resistance movement against the occupying Chinese after 247 years of domination. Many temples are dedicated to them, and a yearly holiday in February to commemorate their deaths is observed by many Vietnamese. A central district in Hanoi called the Hai Bà Trưng District is named after them, as are numerous large streets in major cities and many schools. Their biographies are mentioned in children's school books.

The stories of the Trưng Sisters and of another famous woman warrior, Lady Triệu, are cited by some historians as hints that Vietnamese society before sinicization was a matriarchal one, where there are no obstacles for women in assuming leadership roles.

Even though the Trưng Sisters' revolt against the Chinese was almost 2000 years ago, its legacy in Vietnam remains.  The two sisters are considered to be a national symbol in Vietnam, representing Vietnam's independence.  They are often depicted as two women riding two giant war elephants.  Many times, they are seen leading their followers into battle against the Chinese.  The Trưng sisters were more than two sisters that gave their lives up for their country; they are powerful symbols of Vietnamese resistance and freedom.

In 1962 during the Vietnam War, Trần Lệ Xuân (aka Madame Nhu), sister-in-law of South Vietnamese president Ngô Đình Diệm had a costly statue erected in the capital of Saigon in memory of the Trưng sisters, with the facial features modeled on herself, and also established the Women's Solidarity Movement, a female paramilitary organization,  using the sisters as a rallying symbol.  In the aftermath of the 1963 overthrow of Ngô Đình Diệm, the statues of the sisters were demolished by jubilant anti-Ngô Đình Diệm rioters.

Temples
Temples to the Trưng Sisters or Hai Bà Trưng Temples were found from as early as the end of the Third Era of Northern Domination. The best known Hai Bà Trưng Temple is in Hanoi near Hoàn Kiếm Lake. The temple was constructed by king Lý Anh Tông (r. 1138–1176) in 1158. According to tradition, in that year a devastating drought occurred in the Red River Delta, and the king ordered a Buddhist monk named Cam Thin to conduct a sacrifices rite and pray for rain at the Trung sisters temple. It rained the following day that saved his kingdom from famine. During one night the king dreamed and saw the two sisters appeared and were riding together on an iron horse. When the king awoke, he ordered the temple to be gloriously decorated and performed a sacrifice ritual to the sisters. Later he had other two temples to worship the sisters, which one was destroyed by river landslide and another one temple which still being today. Other Hai Bà Trưng temples are found in Mê Linh District (Vĩnh Phúc Province), Phúc Thọ District (Hà Tây Province) and Hoàng Hoa Thám Street, Bình Thạnh District, Ho Chi Minh City.

Women's status
One reason for the defeat is desertion by rebels because they did not believe they could win under a woman's leadership.  The fact that women were in charge was blamed as a reason for the defeat by historical Vietnamese texts in which the historians ridiculed and mocked men because they did nothing while "mere girls", whom they viewed with revulsion, took up the banner of revolt. The historical poem containing the phrase "mere girls", which related the revolt of the Trung Sisters while the men did nothing, was not intended to praise women nor view war as women's work, as it has been wrongly interpreted.

Music
Lưu Hữu Phước wrote the patriotic song Hát Giang trường hận (Long Hatred on Hát River) between 1942–1943 to dedicate to the Trưng sisters. Later, Phước revised the lyrics in 1946 to create another song  (Soul of the Matyred Soldier), which is often used as lament for state funerals, and the lyrics still mentioned the Trưng sisters' rebellion.

See also
 Lady Triệu
 Phùng Thị Chính
 Copper columns of Ma Yuan
 Bùi Thị Xuân
 Matriarchy
 Feminism

Notes

References

Bibliography

External links

 Trưng sisters  Tuyet A. Tran & Chu V. Nguyen

 
12 births
43 deaths
Han dynasty rebels
Monarchs taken prisoner in wartime
People executed by Vietnam by decapitation